Faster is a 2010 American action thriller film directed by George Tillman Jr. with Dwayne Johnson and Billy Bob Thornton as a criminal seeking vengeance and the corrupt cop who pursues him, respectively. Tom Berenger, Oliver Jackson-Cohen, Adewale Akinnuoye-Agbaje and Carla Gugino also appear. Faster was released on November 24, 2010, and grossed $35 million against production budget of $24 million.

Plot
On leaving prison James "Jimmy" Cullen retrieves his 1970 Chevrolet Chevelle, a gun, and a list of names before heading to an office in Bakersfield, California and killing a man. He then visits Roy Grone, who gave him the car and gun, and forces him to give him more names. Meanwhile, Cullen is tracked by detectives Cicero and Humphries; a hitman known as “Killer” is also hired to kill Cullen.

Cullen locates the second person on his list, Kenneth Tyson, who films his own personal snuff films. After finding and killing Tyson, Cullen gets into a gunfight with Killer in the hallway, but manages to escape. This affects Killer philosophically, and, after proposing to his girlfriend, begins to take the task personally. Humphries and Cicero investigate Cullen’s past and discover he was double-crossed during a robbery. Cicero remembers him from a video of his older half-brother Gary's death filmed by Tyson, which depicts an unidentified man shooting Cullen in the head; he narrowly survives, and has a metal plate surgically implanted in his skull.

Cullen visits his former girlfriend, who knows he is killing those involved in the video. After revealing that she aborted their unborn child and has begun a new life, she wishes him well. At a strip club in Nevada Cullen stabs bouncer Hovis Nixon for his role in Gary’s death, but he manages to survive. Soon, both Humphries and Killer get word that Nixon is in the hospital. Knowing Cullen will go back to finish him off, they converge there.

Cullen enters the hospital and kills Nixon while he is in surgery. Humphries attempts to unsuccessfully bring down Cullen, but is spared when the latter sees his badge. While driving away from the hospital, Cullen encounters Killer where they get into a high-speed chase on the freeway, culminating in Killer shooting Cullen in the neck.

Eventually Cullen comes to believe that his father arranged to have him and Gary killed after they refused to share the money they stole in a bank robbery. However, Cullen finds out that his father died years before, and realises that it was Gary’s girlfriend who sold them out. The last man on his list is a traveling evangelist named Alexander Jerrod; after concluding his service, he is confronted by Cullen, but is spared after revealing that he has turned his life around and begging for forgiveness. Cullen is then confronted by Killer.

Cicero eventually learns the true identity of the man who shot Cullen, and she hurries to the church where Humphries is already on the scene. As Killer and Cullen confront each other, Humphries walks in and shoots Cullen in the head, revealing it was he who shot him in the video. He offers Killer the money for the job, but Killer declines, telling Humphries to never contact him again.

Humphries calls his wife, who is revealed to have been his informant while she was still Gary's girlfriend. Suddenly, he is shot and killed by Cullen, who survived due to his metal plate. Cicero arrives on the scene after Cullen leaves, and she covers up Humphries’ involvement.

Cullen scatters Gary's ashes in the sea and drives off into the sunset, while Killer returns home to his wife; simultaneously, Jerrod begins a sermon on forgiveness.

Cast
 Dwayne Johnson as Jimmy Cullen/Driver, a small-time criminal who avenges his brother's death.
 Billy Bob Thornton as Detective Slade Humphries/Cop, a corrupt police detective responsible for the robbery and murder of Gary, Driver's brother.
 Carla Gugino as Detective Cicero, a police detective who works with Humphries.
 Oliver Jackson-Cohen as Killer, a hit-man hired by Slade to kill Driver.
 Maggie Grace as Lily, Killer's girlfriend. Later, his wife.
 Moon Bloodgood as Marina Humphries.
 Courtney Gains as Prescott Ashton/Telemarketer.
 John Cirigliano as Kenneth Tyson/Old Guy
 Lester Speight as Hovis Nixon/Baphomet.
 Adewale Akinnuoye-Agbaje as Alexander Jarod Evangelist, a former criminal who is now a priest.
 Tom Berenger as Warden.
 Mike Epps as Roy Grone.
 Xander Berkeley as Sergeant Mallory.
 Matt Gerald as Gary Cullen.
 Annie Corley as Mrs Cullen.
 Jennifer Carpenter as Nan Porterman.
 Michael Irby as Vaquero.

Production
Variety reported in May 2009 that Dwayne Johnson was in final negotiations for his role and that Phil Joanou would be directing. That September it was reported that Joanou had dropped out and George Tillman Jr. would direct. Salma Hayek was considered for the role of Cicero, but a week before filming was started she dropped out due to "scheduling issues". Hayek was replaced by Carla Gugino. Principal photography began on February 8, 2010, in Los Angeles, California and continued in Pasadena and Santa Clarita in California.

Chevelle
The Chevrolet Chevelle driven by "Driver" which is prominently displayed in the movie has the rear of a 1971 or 1972 model, but the front of a 1970 model presumably due to the rarity and value of the 1970 Chevelle SS 454 which the car in the film is presumably portraying (it is never actually specified).

Soundtrack

Additionally, another song used for the film include "En mi viejo San Juan" (Spanish for, "In my old San Juan") composed and sung by Mexican singer and actor, Javier Solís.

Release
The film grossed $12,200,000 over the five-day Thanksgiving release. It stayed in theaters until February 10, 2011. The film ultimately grossed $35,626,958 worldwide. The film was produced on a $24 million budget. It was released on video on March 1, 2011, and it grossed another $17.3 million in DVD and Blu-ray sales in the US.

Reception

Review aggregator Rotten Tomatoes reports that 42% of 130 critics have given the film a positive review; the rating average is 4.87 out of 10. The site's consensus reads: "It's good to see Dwayne Johnson back in full-throttle action mode, but Faster doesn't deliver enough of the high-octane thrills promised by its title." It holds a Metacritic score of 44 out of 100 based on 24 critics, indicating "mixed or average reviews".

Roger Ebert for the Chicago Sun-Times said, "Rotate the plot, change the period, spruce up the dialogue, and this could have been a hard boiled 1940s noir. But it doesn't pause for fine touches and efficiently delivers action for an audience that likes one-course meals".

References

External links
 Official website (archive)
 
 
 
 
 

2010 films
2010 action thriller films
2010s American films
2010s English-language films
2010s vigilante films
American action thriller films
American films about revenge
American police detective films
American vigilante films
Castle Rock Entertainment films
CBS Films films
Films about bank robbery
Films about contract killing
Films directed by George Tillman Jr.
Films produced by Robert Teitel
Films scored by Clint Mansell
Films set in Los Angeles
Films shot in California
TriStar Pictures films